Teatao Teannaki (15 June 1935– 11 October 2016) was an I-Kiribati political figure who served as President of Kiribati from 1991 until 1994.

He was first elected to represent Abaiang in the House of Assembly of the Gilbert Islands. 

Teatao Teannaki, Minister of State in the previous government of Chief Minister Naboua Ratieta, became Minister for Education, Training and Culture in March 1978. At independence on 12 July 1979, Tabai immediately nominated Teannaki as Vice-president. He served as Vice President under the three mandates of Sir Ieremia Tabai. He would also serve as the Minister of Home Affairs in 1987, and as Minister of Finance from 1987 to 1991.

Replacing Babera Kirata, suddenly dead before the general election, he was narrowly elected to replace Tabai as the President of Kiribati on behalf of the National Progressive Party of Kiribati from 8 July 1991 until 1 October 1994. It is said that Tabai continued to exert political influence in the Kiribati government throughout Teannaki's term. Teannaki also served as Foreign Minister beginning in 1992.

He was succeeded by Teburoro Tito after defeat in a September 1994 election.

Teannaki was at the helm of the National Progressive Party as of July 2015. Teannaki died in a maneaba namely Ueen Abaiang during a meeting with the Unimane of Abaiang Called " te Ie nao" (following a heart attack on 11 October 2016. at the age of 80.

References

Lentz, Harris M., III. ''Heads of State and Governments". Jefferson, NC:McFarland & Company, Inc. 1994. .

1930s births
2016 deaths
Presidents of Kiribati
Vice-presidents of Kiribati
Speakers of the House of Assembly of Kiribati
Members of the House of Assembly (Kiribati)
Finance ministers of Kiribati
Government ministers of Kiribati
National Progressive Party (Kiribati) politicians
People from the Gilbert Islands
20th-century I-Kiribati politicians
21st-century I-Kiribati politicians
Tobwaan Kiribati Party politicians